A sebaceous adenoma, a type of adenoma, a cutaneous condition characterized by a slow-growing tumor usually presenting as a pink, flesh-coloured, or yellow papule or nodule.

Significance
Sebaceous adenomas, in isolation, are not significant; however, they may be associated with Muir-Torre syndrome, a genetic condition that predisposes individuals to cancer.  It is also linked to hereditary nonpolyposis colorectal cancer (Lynch syndrome).

It is not the same as "adenoma sebaceum" by F. Balzer and P.E. Ménétrier (1885). The term "adenoma sebaceum" is a misnomer for facial angiofibromas associated with tuberous sclerosis complex.

See also 
 Sebaceous carcinoma
 Sebaceous hyperplasia
 List of cutaneous conditions
 List of cutaneous neoplasms associated with systemic syndromes

References

Footnotes

Citations

Sources

External links 

Epidermal nevi, neoplasms, and cysts